On 21 November 2015, a major landslide in Hpakant, Kachin State, northern Myanmar killed at least 116 people near a jade mine, with around 100 more missing.

Landslide

The landslide occurred in the early morning hours, when a man-made heap of waste soil from the nearby jade mine collapsed. Many of those killed were people living in a small village near the waste heap, including both miners and those who scavenged through the waste soil looking for jade remnants to sell. The cause of the collapse is not known.

Rescue efforts by the Myanmar Red Cross and other groups were made to find and recover survivors; one person was pulled from the rubble alive, but subsequently died from injuries. At least 116 bodies were reported as having been recovered. Around a hundred people were reported as missing. The total number of casualties cannot be accurately estimated, as the precise number of people who lived near the site is not known. According to a Hpakant Township General Administration Department official, people had been warned to avoid living near the waste heap because of its potential for landslides.

Investigation
The jade industry in Myanmar generates estimated annual revenues of US$31 billion. It is presently unclear which companies are responsible for the waste dump, although it is known that prior to the 2015 democratic election, many of these were controlled by the military leadership of the country, leading to questionable safety practices and corruption. Deaths from similar landslides are common, but none have matched the scale of the Hpakant landslide. A spokesman for the National League for Democracy party said they will investigate the companies and the practices that led to this disaster.

See also
2015 Myanmar floods

References

2015 in Myanmar
2015 mining disasters
Landslides in 2015
Landslides in Myanmar
Mining disasters in Myanmar
Kachin State
2015 disasters in Myanmar